The following is a list of people engaged in spying for the UK.

Pre-WWI

World War I

Interwar period

World War II

Post WWII

References

See also
 History of espionage

United Kingdom intelligence community
Spies